Andrea Tirali (around 1660–1737) was an Italian architect working in Venice and the Veneto. He was responsible for the intricate design of the pavement in the Piazza San Marco in Venice (from 1723). 

In the Basilica of Saints Giovanni e Paolo, Venice, he built the chapel of St Dominic (1700-20) and the elaborate tomb of the Valier doges (c. 1704–07). He designed the portico to Vincenzo Scamozzi's San Nicolò di Tolentino  (1706-14) and the facade of S. Vidal (c. 1725–35). Other works in Venice include the Ponte dei Tre Archi at Cannaregio (1688), Scuola dell'Angelo Custode at Santi Apostoli (1713), Palazzo Priuli (later Manfrin Venier; 1724–31), the Palazzo Diedo (between 1710 and 1720) and the staircase of Ca' Sagredo (c. 1734). 

He is the architect of the Villa Morosini (later Vendramin Calergi) at Fiesso Umbertiano (from 1706) and possibly Villa Sceriman (later Widmann Foscari Rezzonico; 1719) at Mira. 

From 1700, he built the bell tower of San Martino in Burano. 
He also designed the church of SS. Trinità (1703-07) and the Palazzo Grassi (1703-14) in Chioggia as well as the nearby Santuario of S.Maria di San Vito (1717-23) at Pellestrina. 

He died suddenly at Monselice in 1737 while building a new wing to Scamozzi's Villa Duodo (completed in 1740).

References

External links

1657 births
1737 deaths
17th-century Italian architects
18th-century Italian architects
Italian Baroque architects
Architects from Venice